Timmy Sumner (born 9 October 1994) is a former professional Australian rules footballer who played for the Gold Coast Football Club in the Australian Football League (AFL). He was recruited by the club in the 2012 National Draft, with pick No. 55. Sumner made his debut in Round 10, 2013, against  at Kardinia Park. Sumner retired from the game on 8 April 2015. He played 17 games for the Suns.

Statistics

|- style="background-color: #EAEAEA"
! scope="row" style="text-align:center" | 2013
|
| 39 || 11 || 6 || 12 || 62 || 34 || 96 || 30 || 17 || 0.5 || 1.1 || 5.6 || 3.1 || 8.7 || 2.7 || 1.5
|-
! scope="row" style="text-align:center" | 2014
|
| 3 || 6 || 0 || 5 || 21 || 20 || 41 || 4 || 13 || 0.0 || 0.8 || 3.5 || 3.3 || 6.8 || 0.7 || 2.2
|- style="background-color: #EAEAEA"
! scope="row" style="text-align:center" | 2015
|
| 3 || 0 || — || — || — || — || — || — || — || — || — || — || — || — || — || —
|- class="sortbottom"
! colspan=3| Career
! 17
! 6
! 17
! 83
! 54
! 137
! 34
! 30
! 0.4
! 1.0
! 4.9
! 3.2
! 8.1
! 2.0
! 1.8
|}

References

External links

1994 births
Living people
Gold Coast Football Club players
Australian rules footballers from South Australia
Woodville-West Torrens Football Club players
Indigenous Australian players of Australian rules football